The Hong Kong Outstanding Students Award is a student contest in Hong Kong. The Award aims to encourage promising students with outstanding academic, extra-curricular and community service achievements, and morality.

From 1985 to 2010, the Award was organized by the Lion & Globe Educational Trust and co-organized by the Outstanding Young Persons' Association. Starting from 2011, the Award is organized by the Youth Arch Foundation and co-organized by the Outstanding Young Persons' Association. Every year, about ten secondary school students from local and international schools in Hong Kong are selected to be the "Hong Kong Outstanding Students".

History

The Award began in 1985 as the "Hong Kong Outstanding Female Students Award", which only accepted applications from female students; it was opened to male students in 1987. Over the first 25 years, the Award had been organized by Doreen Leung, the first female recipient of the Outstanding Young Persons of the World. Since Leung died in 2009, a group of past winners and finalists of the Award founded the Youth Arch Foundation in 2010, succeeding to the role of Leung as the event organizer of the Awards.

Judging criteria
 Outstanding academic performance
 Achievements in extra-curricular activities
 Track record of community services
 Commitment to contribute to society
 Leadership potential

Selection process
Before 2011, applicants first needed to sit for a written test that comprises questions from all disciplines, including languages, mathematics, logic, science, history, geography and current issues. 40 finalists would be selected to participate in the group interview, after which 10 or 11 winners would be selected.

Since 2011, applicants, as the first step, are required to take a written test of similar format. 50 finalists are short-listed to participate in a 2-day camp which aims to assess applicants’ inter-personal skills and leadership potential.  20 students are then selected to enter the panel interview round. Finally, 10 winners are chosen based on their performance in all stages.

Prizes
All awardees and finalists of the Award are invited to join a four-day summer leadership training camp. Starting from 2011, winners of the Award will be invited to partake in a study tour. In 2013 and 2014, awardees went on to an experiential learning and cycling trip in Cambodia. In 2015, students participated in a service learning and environmental trip in Sumatra, where there were guided to produce environmental-themed videos.

Other awards
In 2009, Doreen Leung, died. In memory of her, Youth Arch Foundation set up the Doreen Leung Memorial Service Award in 2010 to uphold her selfless spirit of serving the community.

The awardee is selected according to his or her community services records, as well as voting result among the nominees. Chung To, a social leader and Chi Heng Foundation Founder and chairperson, will be the mentor of the awardee for a year.

Hong Kong Outstanding Students' Association
The winners and finalists of the Award founded the Hong Kong Outstanding Students' Association (HKOSA) in 1987, a student-run organization. All winners and finalists of the Award are automatically enrolled to HKOSA once they are shortlisted to enter the final interview round.

The organization has initiated a number of creative and innovative projects that aim to inspire other secondary school students in different ways. Some of the regular activities organized include the annual Leadership Interflow Camp since 1991, the Volunteer Training Scheme since 1998, the Hong Kong Youth Summit, a forum for students to discuss current issues, since 2003, and the International Convergence, which is a multi-cultural experience scheme, since 2005. These activities typically attract participation of over 100 students from different secondary schools.

HKOSA is supported by a group of honorary advisors, which include consuls general, university presidents and government officials. Some of them include:
Anson Chan, Former Chief Secretary for the Administration
Audrey Eu, Former Legislative Councillor
Eric Li, Member of the 10th National Committee of Chinese People's Political Consultative Conference
Regina Ip, Former Secretary for Security; Legislative Councillor
Michael Suen, Former Secretary for Education 
Jasper Tsang, President of the Legislative Council of Hong Kong
Rosanna Wong (王䓪鳴), executive director of the Hong Kong Federation of Youth Groups

Schools by number of Outstanding Student Award winners

Notable winners and finalists
Many of the winners and finalists achieved excellent results in the Hong Kong Certificate of Education Examination with a good number of them having obtained 10As and 9As. Many were admitted to universities such as Ivy League institutions and Oxbridge. Up to 2016, the alumni base of the Award (commonly known as “OSArs”) has reached over 1100 people. Many of them now work in fields including government, business, law, medicine, entertainment, education, architecture, journalism, and engineering.

Some of the notable winners and finalists are:

 Au Hoishun Stephanie, Swimmer at Beijing Olympics 2008; Holder of 11 Hong Kong's long and short course (freestyle) records
 Mung Chiang, Arthur LeGrand Doty Professor of Electrical Engineering, Director of the Keller Center, Princeton University, 2013 Alan T. Waterman Award recipient 
 Cheong Leong, executive director, Charities and Community, The Hong Kong Jockey Club, and chairman and CEO of RunOurCity, an innovative social enterprise he co-founded with the aim of transforming life through running.  He has been an honorary advisor and director of Social Ventures Hong Kong, a pioneer venture philanthropic fund, since its inception in 2007.
Poman Lo CEO and Founder of Century Innovative Technology Limited (CITL). She is also the Vice Chairman of Century City International Holdings Limited and Regal Hotels International Holdings Limited and an executive director of Paliburg Holdings Limited and managing director of Regal Portfolio Management Limited.
 Perry So, Assistant Conductor of Hong Kong Philharmonic Orchestra; Youngest winner at 5th International Prokofiev Conducting Competition
Joey Wat, CEO of Yum China
Patrick Fong, Member of Tobacco and Cigarettes Civic Party.
 Titus Law, Founder of Titus College.
 Cyrus Wong, first man who has a Turtle-Degree in Hong Kong.
 Cai Donglin, County Secretary of Feixi County, China.

References

External links
Youth Arch Foundation
Hong Kong Outstanding Students' Association

Student awards
Education in Hong Kong
Awards established in 1985
1985 establishments in Hong Kong